Lake Lahontan was a large endorheic Pleistocene lake of modern northwestern Nevada that extended into northeastern California and southern Oregon. The area of the former lake is a large portion of the Great Basin that borders the Sacramento River watershed to the west.

The lake was named by Clarence King during the Geological Exploration of the Fortieth Parallel.  The name honors Louis-Armand de Lom d'Arce de Lahontan, Baron de Lahontan, a French soldier and explorer.

History

Lake Lahontan, during this most recent glacial period, would have been one of the largest lakes in North America.

Climate change around the end of the Pleistocene epoch led to a gradual desiccation of ancient Lake Lahontan.  The lake had largely disappeared in its extended form by about 9,000 years ago.  As the surface elevation dropped, the lake broke up into series of smaller lakes, most of which rapidly dried up, leaving only a playa.  These playas include the Black Rock Desert, the Carson Sink, and the Humboldt Sink. The only modern remnants existing as true lakes are Pyramid Lake and Walker Lake. Winnemucca Lake has been dry since the 1930s and Honey Lake periodically desiccates.  The ancient shoreline is evidenced by tufa formations throughout the area.

Surprisingly, the watershed feeding Lake Lahontan is not thought to have been significantly wetter during its highstand than it is currently.  Rather, its desiccation is thought to be mostly due to increase in the evaporation rate as the climate warmed.  Recent computer simulations (using the DSSAM Model and other techniques) indicate, if precipitation and evaporation rates within the watershed were maintained at their historical yearly maximum and minimum, respectively, and if diversions of the Truckee River ceased, the Ice Age extent of Lake Lahontan might return. 

Archaeological evidence along the shore indicates the existence of the lake coincided roughly with the first appearance of humans in the region.  The Lahontan cutthroat trout evolved as a predator species within the waters of Lake Lahontan, feeding on native chub and sucker.  This subspecies of cutthroat trout survives today in tributary rivers of the Great Basin, and has been reintroduced to Pyramid Lake and Walker Lake after being extirpated during the 20th century.

See also
 Lahontan Valley
 Lake Modoc
 Pluvial lake
 Lake Bonneville
 Lake Corcoran

References

Former lakes of the United States
Glacial lakes of the United States
Lakes of the Great Basin
Geology of California
Geology of Nevada
Geology of Oregon
Pleistocene United States